Kaliq Singh (born 9 August 1950) is an Indian boxer. He competed in the men's heavyweight event at the 1984 Summer Olympics.

References

1950 births
Living people
Indian male boxers
Olympic boxers of India
Boxers at the 1984 Summer Olympics
Place of birth missing (living people)
Heavyweight boxers